The Hidalgo County Courthouse, located at 300 S. Shakespeare St. in Lordsburg, is the county courthouse serving Hidalgo County, New Mexico. The two-story Neoclassical building, designed by architects Thorman & Frazier, was constructed in 1926. The red brick building features concrete spandrels between the first- and second-story windows and a concrete band at the top of the second-story windows. The entrance is topped by a classical pediment and flanked by pilasters with floral medallions. A metal cornice and crested parapet wrap around the building's roof line.

The courthouse was added to the National Register of Historic Places on December 7, 1987.

See also

National Register of Historic Places listings in Hidalgo County, New Mexico

References

Courthouses on the National Register of Historic Places in New Mexico
Neoclassical architecture in New Mexico
Government buildings completed in 1926
Buildings and structures in Hidalgo County, New Mexico
County courthouses in New Mexico
National Register of Historic Places in Hidalgo County, New Mexico
1926 establishments in New Mexico